Tikare is a department or commune of Bam Province in north-western Burkina Faso. Its capital lies at the town of Tikare. According to the 1996 census the department has a total population of 33,396.

Towns and villages
Tikaré Ansouri Baribsi Boubou Dafire Dargouma Gasongo Gonga Hamdallaye Horé Ipala Kamtenga Kilou  Koulniéré Manégtaba-Foulbé Manégtaba-Mossi Napalgué Ouampèga Oui Ritimyinga Sancé Sarkounga Songodin  Soukoundougou Tamiga Tampèlga Tanhoka Téonsgo Tirbou Touga Vato-Foulbé Vato-Mossi Yelkoto Yoba Zamsé Zano

References

Departments of Burkina Faso
Bam Province